Henri Kontinen and Heather Watson were the defending champions, but lost in the final to Jamie Murray and Martina Hingis, 4–6, 4–6. This was the second Wimbledon mixed doubles title for both Murray and Hingis. This was the first time since 1934 that both teams in the final featured a British player.

Seeds
All seeds received a bye into the second round.

Draw

Finals

Top half

Section 1

Section 2

Bottom half

Section 3

Section 4

References

 Mixed Doubles Draw
2017 Wimbledon Championships – Doubles draws and results at the International Tennis Federation

External links

X=Mixed Doubles
2017